Athletics at the 1951 Mediterranean Games were held in Alexandria, Egypt.

Results

Track

Field

Medal table

References

External links
Complete 1951 Mediterranean Games Standings.

Med
Athletics
1951